The MEDEA Awards is a free competition launched in November 2007 and organised by the Media & Learning Association. It aims to encourage innovation in the use of moving images and sound in education, across Europe and beyond.

The MEDEA Awards are integrated in the Media & Learning Conference, a yearly conference about the use of media in education which takes place in Brussels, Belgium.

Past Awards Winners

MEDEA Awards 2008 
 Overall Award Winner: Rättegångsskolan på webben/Court introduction by the  Brottsoffermyndigheten/Crime Victim Compensation and Support Authority (Sweden)
 Special Jury Award: Anti-Anti by Sint-Lievenscollege Gent (Belgium)

MEDEA Awards 2009http://www.elearningeuropa.info/en/directory/MEDEA-Awards-2009%3A-Winners 
 Overall Award Winner: Know IT All for Primary Schools by  Childnet International (UK)
 Special Jury Award: Eyes on the Skies by European Southern Observatory (Germany)
 European Collaboration Award: Traditions Across Europe by Istituto Comprensivo “Don Bosco” (Italy)
 Award for Creativity and Innovation: Daisy and Drago by Terakki Foundation Schools (Turkey)

MEDEA Awards 2010http://www.elearningeuropa.info/en/directory/The-9-finalists-of-the-MEDEA-Awards-2010-announced 
 Overall Award Winner and Professional Production Award: BBC News School Report by BBC News (UK)
 Special Jury Award: Pocket Anatomy by eMedia Interactive (Ireland)
 European Collaboration Award: Evolution of Life by LMU Munich (Germany) and CNDP - Centre National de Documentation Pédagogique (France)
 User-Generated Content Award: Et si c'était toi? by the Lycée Technique du Centre (Luxembourg)

References

External links 

MEDEA2020 project website funded by European Commission 
Media & Learning Conference 2011 website

Awards established in 2007
Education awards